Dilophonotini is a tribe of moths of the family Sphingidae described by Hermann Burmeister in 1878.

Taxonomy 
 Subtribe Dilophonotina Burmeister, 1878
 Genus Aellopos Hübner, 1819
 Genus Aleuron Boisduval, 1870
 Genus Baniwa Lichy, 1981
 Genus Callionima Lucas, 1857
 Genus Cautethia Grote, 1865
 Genus Enyo Hübner, 1819
 Genus Erinnyis Hübner, 1819
 Genus Eupyrrhoglossum Grote, 1865
 Genus Hemeroplanes Hübner, 1819
 Genus Himantoides Butler, 1876
 Genus Isognathus C. & R. Felder, 1862
 Genus Kloneus Skinner, 1923
 Genus Madoryx Boisduval, 1875
 Genus Nyceryx Boisduval, 1875
 Genus Oryba Walker, 1856
 Genus Pachygonidia D. S. Fletcher, 1982
 Genus Pachylia Walker, 1856
 Genus Pachylioides Hodges, 1971
 Genus Perigonia Herrich-Schäffer, 1854
 Genus Phryxus Hübner, 1819
 Genus Protaleuron Rothschild & Jordan, 1903
 Genus Pseudosphinx Burmeister, 1856
 Genus Stolidoptera Rothschild & Jordan, 1903
 Genus Unzela Walker, 1856

 Subtribe Hemarina Tutt, 1902
 Genus Cephonodes Hubner, 1819
 Genus Hemaris Dalman, 1816

 
Macroglossinae (moth)
Taxa named by Hermann Burmeister